An air traffic control ground delay program or FAA Flow Control is a traffic flow initiative that is instituted by the United States Federal Aviation Administration (FAA) in the National Airspace System.

This program is usually instituted when the following events occur at an airport:
inclement weather (i.e., reduced visibility, thunderstorms, snow);
a large volume of aircraft going to an airport or en route to another airport in the same line of flight;
an aircraft incident, closed runways; or
a condition that requires increased spacing between aircraft, such as the Instrument Landing System (ILS) approaches vs. visual flight rules (VFR) approaches.

The main factor for determining if a ground delay program is needed is a number called Airport Arrival Rate (AAR). This number is set by the controlling air traffic facility.  When the AAR is reduced by the supporting ATC facility, the Air Traffic Control System Command Center (ATCSCC), in Warrenton, Virginia (Vint Hill Farms Station) institutes a Ground Delay Program.

Ground delay programs (GDP) can affect various sections of the United States' airspace, as well as airports in Canada. That is because Nav Canada inherited the agreement between the FAA and Transport Canada that the Ground Delay Program would be implemented for departures from Canadian airports.  GDPs are always assigned a "scope" and to a specific "center" or tier.  For instance, if Atlanta was affected by a ground delay program, air traffic control could institute delays for just ZTL (Atlanta Center) or each center touching ZTL.  It is possible that the delay may affect centers on the second Tier; that is, each center touching the first tier.  Sometimes the scope of the ground delay programs is set by mileage; that is, all departures that are less than 1,500 miles from the affected center can be included.

These programs usually last for several hours and average delay minutes can vary as conditions change at the said ATC controlled area.

Each aircraft en route to a particular area is assigned an Expect Departure Clearance Time (EDCT). There are various ways that the FAA computes these delays.  To streamline traffic demand the FAA utilizes a computer system called Enhanced Traffic Management System (ETMS) which is used by Traffic Management Personnel to predict, on national and local scales, traffic surges, gaps, and volume based on current and anticipated airborne aircraft.  Traffic Management Personnel evaluate the projected flow of traffic into airports and sectors, then implement the least restrictive action necessary to ensure that traffic demand does not exceed system capacity.  This is also called a "wheels up time" and is when the FAA expects to give takeoff clearance.  Aircraft have 5 minutes on either side of their EDCT to depart or they will be assigned a new 
EDCT and expect further delays.

When conditions improve, or when demand decreases, the ATCSCC begins running compressions.  This is when the ATC facility can accept more traffic or users; that is, airlines cancel flight plans, thus causing openings.  This causes other EDCT times to change and decrease delays.

It is to the flight planner's advantage to file a plan as early as possible to get the earliest EDCT time possible.  Once the AAR has been met, planes that filed later in the day will be pushed into the next time block while those that filed early will be assigned an EDCT closer to the time they filed (first come, first served).

References

External links
 Air Traffic Control System Command Center
 ATRCC Operational Info System

Air traffic control
Federal Aviation Administration